Elena Dementieva was the defending champion, but Agnieszka Radwańska defeated her 6–3, 6–2, in the final.

Seeds
The top two seeds receive a bye into the second round.

Draw

Finals

Top half

Bottom half

External links
Draw and Qualifying Draw

İstanbul Cup
Istanbul Cup - Singles

pl:Istanbul Cup 2008